The region of Greater London, including the City of London, is divided into 73 parliamentary constituencies which are sub-classified as borough constituencies, affecting the type of electoral officer and level of expenses permitted.

Constituencies

Proposed boundary changes 

Following the abandonment of the Sixth Periodic Review (the 2018 review), the Boundary Commission for England formally launched the 2023 Review on 5 January 2021. The Commission calculated that the number of seats to be allocated to the London region will increase by 2 from 73 to 75. Initial proposals were published on 8 June 2021 and, following two periods of public consultation, revised proposals were published on 8 November 2022. Final proposals will be published by 1 July 2023.

Under the revised proposals, an additional constituency named Stratford and Bow would be created, covering parts of the boroughs of Newham and Tower Hamlets and straddling the River Lea and, in the south of the city, there would be a new constituency named Streatham and Norwood, covering parts of the boroughs of Croydon and Lambeth. Elsewhere, changes to boundaries result in a number of name changes. Only Walthamstow, Islington North and Tooting would remain entirely unchanged, with a further seven unchanged except to realign constituency boundaries with local government ward boundaries.

Under the revised proposals, the following constituencies for the region would come into effect at the next general election:

Results history
Primary data source: House of Commons research briefing - General election results from 1918 to 2019

2019 
The number of votes cast for each political party who fielded candidates in constituencies comprising the London region in the 2019 general election were as follows:

Percentage votes 

Key:

CON - Conservative Party, including National Liberal Party up to 1966

LAB - Labour Party

LIB - Liberal Party up to 1979; SDP-Liberal Alliance 1983 & 1987; Liberal Democrats from 1992

UKIP/Br - UK Independence Party 2010 to 2017 (included in Other up to 2005 and in 2019); Brexit Party in 2019

Green - Green Party of England and Wales (included in Other up to 2005)

Seats 

Key:

CON - Conservative Party, including National Liberal Party up to 1966

LAB - Labour Party

LIB - Liberal Party up to 1979; SDP-Liberal Alliance 1983 & 1987; Liberal Democrats from 1992

OTH - 1945 -  (1) Communist Party; (2) Independent Labour (Denis Pritt); 2005 - Respect (George Galloway)

Maps

Metropolitan Board of Works and County of London 1885-1910

County of London 1918-1945

County of London 1950-1970

Greater London 

These are maps of the results of the last 13 general elections in London.
 Red represents seats won by MPs from the Labour Party.
 Blue represents seats won by MPs from the Conservative Party.
 Amber represents seats won by MPs from the Liberal Democrats.
 Green (in 2005) represents the seat won by the sole MP from the Respect Party, George Galloway.
 Yellow (in 1983 and 1987) represents the seat won by the sole MP from the Liberal Party, Simon Hughes, who continued to be an MP of the Liberal Democrats.
 Purple represents the two seats won by MPs from the Social Democratic Party. They were John Cartwright (formerly Labour), and Rosie Barnes.

History

Metropolitan area and County of London (1832 to 1965)

Prior to 1832 
Prior to 1832, the metropolitan area of London was represented by the parliamentary boroughs of City of London (four MPs), Westminster and Southwark (two MPs each). The remainder of the metropolitan area was covered by the historical counties of Middlesex and Surrey.

1832 to 1868 
The Reform Act 1832 gave representation in the London metropolitan area to seven parliamentary boroughs, known as the metropolitan boroughs, with the formation of four additional boroughs, each electing two MPs. In addition, Greenwich was formed as a separate borough from the county of Kent.

City of London
Finsbury
Greenwich
Lambeth
Marylebone
Southwark
Tower Hamlets
Westminster

1868 to 1885 
The Reform Act 1867 expanded the metropolitan area to include the new borough of Chelsea, and Tower Hamlets was divided into the two boroughs of Hackney and Tower Hamlets.

Chelsea
City of London
Finsbury
Greenwich
Hackney
Lambeth
Marylebone
Southwark
Tower Hamlets
Westminster

1885 to 1918 
The Redistribution of Seats Act 1885 extended the area of parliamentary boroughs to the Metropolitan Board of Works area. With the exception of the City of London, whose representation was reduced from four to two MPs, each borough, or division thereof, was represented by one MP. This act increased the number of MPs representing London from 22 to 59.

The County of London was created in 1889 in succession to the Metropolitan Board of Works and, in 1900, the county was divided into 28 boroughs (plus the City of London). However, the old constituency boundaries remained in place until 1918.

For representation by party, see sections 1885 to 1900 and 1900 to 1918.

 Battersea
 Bermondsey
 Bethnal     Green North East
 Bethnal     Green South West
 Bow and Bromley
 Brixton
 Camberwell     North
 Chelsea
 City of London
 Clapham
 Deptford
 Dulwich
 Finsbury     Central
 Finsbury     East
 Fulham
 Greenwich
 Hackney     Central
 Hackney North
 Hackney South
 Haggerston
 Hammersmith
 Hampstead
 Holborn
 Hoxton
 Islington     East
 Islington     North
 Islington     South
 Islington     West
 Kennington
 Kensington     North
 Kensington     South
 Lambeth North
 Lewisham
 Limehouse
 Marylebone     East
 Marylebone     West
 Mile End
 Newington     West
 Norwood
 Paddington     North
 Paddington     South
 Peckham
 Poplar
 Rotherhithe
 St George
 St     George, Hanover Square
 St Pancras East
 St Pancras North
 St Pancras South
 St Pancras West
 Southwark     West
 Stepney
 Strand
 Walworth
 Wandsworth
 Westminster
 Whitechapel
 Woolwich

1918 to 1950 
Under the Representation of the People Act 1918 the parliamentary boroughs corresponded to the London boroughs created in 1900, with each borough, or division thereof, being represented by one MP. The City of London continued to be represented by two MPs despite the very small size of its electorate. The number of MPs was increased from 59 to 62.

For representation by party, see sections 1918 to 1931 and 1931 to 1950.

 Balham     and Tooting
 Battersea     North
 Battersea     South
 Bermondsey     West
 Bethnal     Green North East
 Bethnal     Green South West
 Bow and Bromley
 Brixton
 Camberwell     North
 Camberwell     North West
 Chelsea
 City of London
 Clapham
 Deptford
 Dulwich
 Finsbury
 Fulham East
 Fulham West
 Greenwich
 Hackney     Central
 Hackney North
 Hackney South
 Hammersmith     North
 Hammersmith     South
 Hampstead
 Holborn
 Islington     East
 Islington     North
 Islington     South
 Islington     West
 Kennington
 Kensington     North
 Kensington     South
 Lambeth North
 Lewisham     East
 Lewisham     West
 Limehouse
 Mile End
 Norwood
 Paddington     North
 Paddington     South
 Peckham
 Putney
 Rotherhithe
 St Marylebone
 St Pancras North
 St     Pancras South East
 St     Pancras South West
 Shoreditch
 South Poplar
 Southwark     Central
 Southwark     North
 Southwark     South East
 Stoke Newington
 Streatham
 Wandsworth     Central
 Westminster     Abbey
 Westminster     St George's
 Whitechapel     and St George's
 Woolwich     East
 Woolwich     West

1950 to 1965 
Under the Representation of the People Act 1948, which came into effect for the 1950 general election, the county of London was divided into 43 borough constituencies.

Under the First Periodic Review of Westminster constituencies, effective for the 1955 general election, there were limited changes in London, with a reduction of one constituency across the boroughs of Fulham and Hammersmith.

For representation by party, see section 1950 to 1965.

 Barons Court (from 1955)
 Battersea     North
 Battersea     South
 Bermondsey
 Bethnal Green
 Brixton
 Chelsea
 Cities     of London and Westminster
 Clapham
 Deptford
 Dulwich
 Fulham     (from 1955)
 Fulham East (1950-1955)
 Fulham West (1950-1955)
 Greenwich
 Hackney     Central (1955 onwards)
 Hackney South (1950-1955)
 Hammersmith     North
 Hammersmith     South (1950-1955)
 Hampstead
 Holborn     and St Pancras South
 Islington     East
 Islington     North
 Islington     South West
 Kensington     North
 Kensington     South
 Lewisham     North
 Lewisham     South
 Lewisham     West
 Norwood
 Paddington     North
 Paddington     South
 Peckham
 Poplar
 Putney
 St Marylebone
 St Pancras North
 Shoreditch     and Finsbury
 Southwark
 Stepney
 Stoke     Newington and Hackney North
 Streatham
 Vauxhall
 Wandsworth     Central
 Woolwich     East
 Woolwich     West

Greater London (1965 to current)

1965 to 1974 
Despite Greater London being created in 1965, the old constituency boundaries remained in place until 1974. From 1965 to 1974, Greater London included the following constituencies or parts of constituencies.

For representation by party, see sections North West, North East, South West and South East.

Formerly in County of London 
As per 42 constituencies listed above for 1955 to 1965.

Formerly in Essex 

 Barking
 Dagenham
 East Ham North
 East Ham South
 Epping     (part)
 Hornchurch
 Ilford North
 Ilford South
 Leyton
 Romford
 Walthamstow     East
 Walthamstow     West
 Wanstead     and Woodford
 West Ham North
 West Ham South

Formerly in Hertfordshire 
 Barnet (part)

Formerly in Kent 

 Beckenham
 Bexley
 Bromley
 Chislehurst
 Erith     and Crayford
 Orpington

Formerly in Middlesex 

 Acton
 Brentford     and Chiswick
 Ealing North
 Ealing South
 Edmonton
 Enfield East
 Enfield West (part)
 Feltham
 Finchley
 Harrow Central
 Harrow East
 Harrow West
 Hayes     and Harlington
 Hendon North
 Hendon South
 Heston     and Isleworth
 Hornsey
 Ruislip-Northwood
 Southall
 Southgate
 Tottenham
 Twickenham
 Uxbridge
 Wembley North
 Wembley South
 Willesden     East
 Willesden     West
 Wood Green

Formerly in Surrey 

 Carshalton     (part)
 Croydon     North East
 Croydon     North West
 Croydon     South
 East Surrey (part)
 Kingston-upon-Thames
 Merton     and Morden
 Mitcham
 Richmond     (Surrey)
 Surbiton
 Sutton     and Cheam
 Wimbledon

1974 to 1983 
When Greater London was created in 1965 the existing constituencies crossed county boundaries. The constituency review reported in 1969, and was implemented for the February 1974 election. All 92 constituencies were contained within Greater London and each were within a single London borough, with the exception of the City of London and Westminster South. They were all borough constituencies. The constituencies were also used as electoral divisions for the Greater London Council from 1973 to 1986.

For representation by party, see sections North West, North East, South West and South East.

Acton
Barking
Battersea North
Battersea South
Beckenham
Bermondsey
Bethnal Green and Bow
Bexleyheath
Brent East
Brent North
Brent South
Brentford and Isleworth
Carshalton
Chelsea
Chingford
Chipping Barnet
Chislehurst
City of London and Westminster South
Croydon Central
Croydon North East
Croydon North West
Croydon South
Dagenham
Dulwich
Ealing North
Edmonton
Enfield North
Erith and Crayford
Feltham and Heston
Finchley
Fulham
Greenwich
Hackney Central
Hackney North and Stoke Newington
Hackney South and Shoreditch
Hammersmith North
Hampstead
Harrow Central
Harrow East
Harrow West
Hayes and Harlington
Hendon North
Hendon South
Holborn and St Pancras South
Hornchurch
Hornsey
Ilford North
Ilford South
Islington Central
Islington North
Islington South and Finsbury
Kensington
Kingston upon Thames
Lambeth Central
Lewisham Deptford
Lewisham East
Lewisham West
Leyton
Mitcham and Morden
Newham North East
Newham North West
Newham South
Norwood
Orpington
Paddington
Peckham
Putney
Ravensbourne
Richmond upon Thames
Romford
Ruislip Northwood
St Marylebone
St Pancras North
Sidcup
Southall
Southgate
Stepney and Poplar
Streatham
Surbiton
Sutton and Cheam
Tooting
Tottenham
Twickenham
Upminster
Uxbridge
Vauxhall
Walthamstow
Wanstead and Woodford
Wimbledon
Wood Green
Woolwich East
Woolwich West

1983 to 1997
The constituencies were redrawn for the 1983 election. All 84 constituencies were contained within Greater London and each were within a single London borough, with the exception of the City of London and Westminster South. They were all borough constituencies.

For representation by party, see sections North West, North East, South West and South East.

Barking
Battersea
Beckenham
Bethnal Green and Stepney
Bexleyheath
Bow and Poplar
Brent East
Brent North
Brent South
Brentford and Isleworth
Carshalton and Wallington
Chelsea
Chingford
Chipping Barnet
Chislehurst
City of London and Westminster South
Croydon Central
Croydon North East
Croydon North West
Croydon South
Dagenham
Dulwich
Ealing Acton
Ealing North
Ealing Southall
Edmonton
Eltham
Enfield North
Enfield Southgate
Erith and Crayford
Feltham and Heston
Finchley
Fulham
Greenwich
Hackney North and Stoke Newington
Hackney South and Shoreditch
Hammersmith
Hampstead and Highgate
Harrow East
Harrow West
Hayes and Harlington
Hendon North
Hendon South
Holborn and St Pancras
Hornchurch
Hornsey and Wood Green
Ilford North
Ilford South
Islington North
Islington South and Finsbury
Kensington
Kingston upon Thames
Lewisham Deptford
Lewisham East
Lewisham West
Leyton
Mitcham and Morden
Newham North East
Newham North West
Newham South
Norwood
Old Bexley and Sidcup
Orpington
Peckham
Putney
Ravensbourne
Richmond and Barnes
Romford
Ruislip Northwood
Southwark and Bermondsey
Streatham
Surbiton
Sutton and Cheam
Tooting
Tottenham
Twickenham
Upminster
Uxbridge
Vauxhall
Walthamstow
Wanstead and Woodford
Westminster North
Wimbledon
Woolwich

1997 to 2010
The constituencies were redrawn for the 1997 election. All 74 constituencies were contained within Greater London. Constituencies crossed borough boundaries between Bexley and Greenwich; Ealing, and Hammersmith and Fulham; Kensington and Chelsea, Westminster and the City of London; Kingston upon Thames and Richmond upon Thames; Lambeth and Southwark; Newham and Tower Hamlets; and Redbridge and Waltham Forest. They were all borough constituencies.

For representation by party, see sections North West, North East, South West and South East.

Barking
Battersea
Beckenham
Bethnal Green and Bow
Bexleyheath and Crayford
Brent East
Brent North
Brent South
Brentford and Isleworth
Bromley and Chislehurst
Camberwell and Peckham
Carshalton and Wallington
Chingford and Woodford Green
Chipping Barnet
Cities of London and Westminster
Croydon Central
Croydon North
Croydon South
Dagenham
Dulwich and West Norwood
Ealing, Acton and Shepherd's Bush
Ealing North
Ealing, Southall
East Ham
Edmonton
Eltham
Enfield North
Enfield, Southgate
Erith and Thamesmead
Feltham and Heston
Finchley and Golders Green
Greenwich and Woolwich
Hackney North and Stoke Newington
Hackney South and Shoreditch
Hammersmith and Fulham
Hampstead and Highgate
Harrow East
Harrow West
Hayes and Harlington
Hendon
Holborn and St Pancras
Hornchurch
Hornsey and Wood Green
Ilford North
Ilford South
Islington North
Islington South and Finsbury
Kensington and Chelsea
Kingston and Surbiton
Lewisham, Deptford
Lewisham East
Lewisham West
Leyton and Wanstead
Mitcham and Morden
North Southwark and Bermondsey
Old Bexley and Sidcup
Orpington
Poplar and Canning Town
Putney
Regent's Park and Kensington North
Richmond Park
Romford
Ruislip-Northwood
Streatham
Sutton and Cheam
Tooting
Tottenham
Twickenham
Upminster
Uxbridge
Vauxhall
Walthamstow
West Ham
Wimbledon

Since 2010
The constituencies were redrawn for the 2010 election. All 73 constituencies are contained within Greater London. Constituencies cross borough boundaries between Barking and Dagenham, and Havering; Brent and Camden; Harrow and Hillingdon; Kensington and Chelsea, and Hammersmith and Fulham; Redbridge and Waltham Forest; Bexley and Greenwich; Bromley and Lewisham; Kingston upon Thames and Richmond upon Thames; Lambeth and Southwark; and Westminster and the City of London. They are all borough constituencies.

For representation by party, see sections North West, North East, South West and South East.

Barking
Battersea
Beckenham
Bermondsey and Old Southwark
Bethnal Green and Bow
Bexleyheath and Crayford
Brent Central
Brent North
Brentford and Isleworth
Bromley and Chislehurst
Camberwell and Peckham
Carshalton and Wallington
Chelsea and Fulham
Chingford and Woodford Green
Chipping Barnet
Cities of London and Westminster
Croydon Central
Croydon North
Croydon South
Dagenham and Rainham
Dulwich and West Norwood
Ealing Central and Acton
Ealing North
Ealing Southall
East Ham
Edmonton
Eltham
Enfield North
Enfield Southgate
Erith and Thamesmead
Feltham and Heston
Finchley and Golders Green
Greenwich and Woolwich
Hackney North and Stoke Newington
Hackney South and Shoreditch
Hammersmith
Hampstead and Kilburn
Harrow East
Harrow West
Hayes and Harlington
Hendon
Holborn and St Pancras
Hornchurch and Upminster
Hornsey and Wood Green
Ilford North
Ilford South
Islington North
Islington South and Finsbury
Kensington
Kingston and Surbiton
Lewisham Deptford
Lewisham East
Lewisham West and Penge
Leyton and Wanstead
Mitcham and Morden
Old Bexley and Sidcup
Orpington
Poplar and Limehouse
Putney
Richmond Park
Romford
Ruislip Northwood and Pinner
Streatham
Sutton and Cheam
Tooting
Tottenham
Twickenham
Uxbridge and South Ruislip
Vauxhall
Walthamstow
West Ham
Westminster North
Wimbledon

Historical representation by party 
A cell marked → (with a different colour background to the preceding cell) indicates that the previous MP continued to sit under a new party name.

Metropolitan area and County of London (1885 to 1965)

1885 to 1900

1900 to 1918

1918 to 1931

1931 to 1950

1950 to 1974

Greater London (1974 to current)

North West London
The boroughs of Hillingdon, Harrow, Brent, Ealing, Barnet, Camden, Hammersmith & Fulham, Kensington & Chelsea and Westminster, and the City of London.

1974 to 1997

1997 to present

North East London
The boroughs of Barking & Dagenham, Enfield, Hackney, Haringey, Havering, Islington, Newham, Redbridge, Tower Hamlets and Waltham Forest.

1974 to 1997

1997 to present

South West London
The boroughs of Croydon, Hounslow, Kingston, Merton, Richmond, Sutton and Wandsworth.

1974 to 1997

1997 to present

South East London
The boroughs of Bexley, Bromley, Greenwich, Lambeth, Lewisham and Southwark.

1974 to 1997

1997 to present

See also
 List of United Kingdom Parliament constituencies
 List of electoral divisions in Greater London
 List of electoral wards in Greater London
 List of London Assembly constituencies

Notes

References

External links 
 

London
 
Constituencies